Anisodactylini is a tribe of ground beetles in the family Carabidae. There are more than 30 genera and 380 described species in Anisodactylini.

Genera
These 31 genera belong to the tribe Anisodactylini:

 Allendia Noonan, 1974
 Allocinopus Broun, 1903
 Amphasia Newman, 1838
 Anisodactylus Dejean, 1829
 Anisostichus Emden, 1953
 Cenogmus Sloane, 1898
 Chydaeus Chaudoir, 1854
 Crasodactylus Guérin-Méneville, 1847
 Criniventer Emden, 1953
 Diachromus Erichson, 1837
 Dicheirus Mannerheim, 1843
 Gaioxenus Broun, 1910
 Geopinus LeConte, 1847
 Gnathaphanus W.S.MacLeay, 1825
 Gynandromorphus Dejean, 1829
 Haplaner Chaudoir, 1878
 Harpalomimetes Schauberger in Csiki, 1932
 Hypharpax W.S.MacLeay, 1825
 Maoriharpalus Larochelle & Larivière, 2005
 Nornalupia Kataev, 2002
 Notiobia Perty, 1830
 Parabaris Broun, 1881
 Progonochaetus G.Müller, 1938
 Pseudanisotarsus Noonan, 1973
 Pseudognathaphanus Schauberger, 1932
 Pseudorhysopus Kataev & Wrase, 2001
 Rhysopus Andrewes, 1929
 Scybalicus Schaum, 1862
 Triplosarus Bates, 1874
 Tuiharpalus Larochelle & Larivière, 2005
 Xestonotus LeConte, 1853

References

Harpalinae